Autumntales is the second studio album by the German folk metal band Lyriel.

Reception

The Sonic Seducer praised the diversity of singer Jessica Thierjung's voice. The reviewer of Metal Hammer Germany, however, complained about the quality of the lead vocals and criticised an overall lack of clear structures in the band's songwriting.

Track listing

Personnel
Jessica Thierjung - vocals
Martin Ahmann - keyboards
Linda Laukamp - cello, backing vocals
Daniel de Beer - drums
Sven Engelmann - bass
Joon Laukamp - violin
Oliver Thierjung - guitars, backing vocals

Additional personnel
Sabine Dünser (Elis) - vocals on "My Favourite Dream"
Carolin Schweitzer - cover art, photography, design

References

Lyriel albums
2006 albums